Muhammed Ahmed Taha or Kameran Mukri, (کامەران موکری in Kurdish), (1929 – 12 July 1986), was an Iraqi Kurdish poet and writer.  Mukeri was born in Sulaimaniya city in Iraqi Kurdistan in 1929.

References

1929 births
1986 deaths
Iraqi Kurdish people
Kurdish-language poets
Kurdish poets
People from Sulaymaniyah
20th-century poets